Time and Tide (usually derived from the proverb Time and tide wait for no man) may refer to:

Music

Albums 
Time and Tide (Greenslade album), 1975
Time and Tide (Basia album), 1987
Time and Tide (Battlefield Band album), 2002
Time and Tide (Split Enz album), 1982
Time and Tide (Steve Ashley album), 2007

Songs 
 "Time and Tide" (Alan Price song), the theme to the 1982 film The Plague Dogs, sung by Alan Price (of The Animals)
"Time and Tide" (Basia song), a 1987 song from the Time and Tide Basia album

Film 
Time and Tide (1916 film), an American silent film by B. Reeves Eason
Time and Tide (1983 film), a Japanese film by Azuma Morisaki
Time and Tide (2000 film), a Hong Kong action film by Tsui Hark
Time & Tide (2006 film), a Tuvaluan documentary film

Other uses 
Time and Tide (magazine), a literary magazine published in England between the 1920s and the 1970s
Time and Tide (novel),  a 1992 novel by Edna O'Brien
"Time and Tide" (Agent Carter), an episode of the American television series Agent Carter
Ao no 6-gou: Saigetsu Fumahito Time and Tide, a video game released for the Dreamcast and commonly referred to in Western countries by its English language subtitle.
Time and Tide Bell, a public art project in the United Kingdom comprising sculptural bells rung by high tide

See also
Time and Tide Museum, a museum dedicated to the maritime history of Great Yarmouth, Norfolk
Time (disambiguation)
Tide (disambiguation)